The Sedgwick Memorial Medal, given by the American Public Health Association, was established in 1929 for distinguished service and advancement of public health knowledge and practice. It is considered the APHA's highest honor.

The medal is established in honour of William Thompson Sedgwick (1855–1921).

Award recipients
Source: APHA

 1929 Charles V. Chapin
 1930 Theobald Smith
 1931 George W. McCoy
 1932 William H. Park
 1933 Milton J. Rosenau
 1934 Edwin O. Jordon
 1935 Haven Emerson
 1936 Frederick F. Russell
 1938 Wade H. Frost
 1939 Thomas Parran
 1940 Hans Zinsser
 1941 Charles Armstrong
 1942 C.E.A. Winslow
 1943 James S. Simmons
 1944 Ernest W. Goodpasture
 1946 Karl F. Meyer
 1947 Reginald M. Atwater
 1948 Abel Wolman
 1949 Henry F. Vaughan
 1950 Rolla Eugene Dyer
 1951 Edward S. Godfrey
 1952 Kenneth F. Maxcy
 1953 Carl E. Buck
 1954 Willson G. Smillie
 1955 Albert J. Chesley
 1956 Frederick W. Jackson
 1957 Lowell J. Reed
 1958 Martha May Eliot
 1959 Louis I. Dublin
 1960 Fred T. Foard
 1961 Frank G. Boudreau
 1962 Ira V. Hiscock
 1963 Gaylord W. Anderson
 1964 Leona Baumgartner
 1965 Willimina R. Walsh
 1966 Fred L. Soper
 1967 George Baehr
 1968 Herman E. Hilleboe
 1969 Marion W. Sheahan
 1970 Hugh R. Leavell
 1971 Margaret G. Arnstein
 1972 Paul B. Cornely
 1973 Isidore S. Falk
 1974 Myron E. Wegman
 1975 Leroy Edgar Burney
 1976 Malcolm H. Merrill
 1977 Lester Breslow
 1978 M. Allen Pond
 1979 Doris E. Roberts
 1980 Lorin E. Kerr
 1981 Dwight F. Metzler
 1982 C. Rufus Rorem
 1983 Milton I. Roemer
 1984 Milton Terris
 1985 Henrik L. Blum
 1986 C. Arden Miller
 1987 Larry J. Gordon
 1988 Dorothy P. Rice
 1989 Clarence L. Brumback
 1990 Cecil G. Sheps
 1991 Ruth Roemer
 1992 Julius B. Richmond
 1993 William H. Foege
 1994 William H. McBeath
 1995 Joyce Lashof
 1996 Leonard Schuman
 1997 Victor W. Sidel
 1998 H. Jack Geiger
 1999 Avedis Donabedian
 2000 Philip R. Lee
 2001 Myron Allukian
 2002 C. William Keck
 2003 E. Richard Brown
 2004 Kenneth Olden
 2005 Barry S. Levy
 2006 Jonathan E. Fielding
 2007 Mohammad N. Akhter
 2008 John Murray Last
 2009 Robert S. Lawrence
 2010 William Schaffner
 2011 David Satcher
 2012 Richard Joseph Jackson
 2013 Douglas Bernard Kirby
 2014 Howard K. Koh
 2015 Hortensia Amaro
 2016 Lawrence W. Green
 2017 José F. Cordero
 2018 Risa Lavizzo-Mourey
 2019 F. Douglas Scutchfield
 2020 Robert K. Ross
 2021 Oliver T. Fein
 2022 Wafaa El-Sadr

See also

 List of medicine awards

References
 

Awards established in 1929
Medicine awards
1929 establishments in the United States
American awards